BAAF is a four-letter acronym that may stand for:

 Big Apple Anime Fest — An anime convention which was held annually between 2001 and 2003 in New York City
 Blackstone Army Airfield, abbreviated as Blackstone AAF or BAAF
 British Association for Adoption and Fostering — A UK membership association. Its services include publishing, training, advice, consultancy and family finding related to child adoption and fostering
 Brussels Ancient Art Fair or Basel Ancient Art Fair, an art fair held yearly in both Brussels and Basel specializing in classical, Egyptian, and Near Eastern antiquities
 Deezy Baaf, a New Zealand rapper/singer known more commonly for the creation of Baafism, a religion that has been described by observers as a cult